

315001–315100 

|-id=012
| 315012 Hutchings ||  || John Barrie Hutchings (born 1941), an astrophysicist who uses observations from the entire electromagnetic spectrum to probe intrinsically-luminous stars, X-ray binaries, neutron stars and stellar-mass black holes, as well as active galactic nuclei and quasars. || 
|-id=046
| 315046 Gianniferrari ||  || Gianni Ferrari (born 1938) is the founder of the Modena Amateur Astronomers Group. He has given many lectures and written several articles and computer programs and also two books about sundial calculations. || 
|-id=088
| 315088 Daniels ||  || Steven W. Daniels (born 1959), a Physics Professor and Department Chair at Eastern Illinois University. || 
|}

315101–315200 

|-id=166
| 315166 Pawelmaksym ||  || Pawel Maksym (1983–2013), an astronomy popularizer in Poland. || 
|-id=174
| 315174 Sellek ||  || Douglas J. Sellek (1945–1996), a middle-school science teacher and an advocate of the sciences || 
|-id=186
| 315186 Schade ||  || David Joseph Schade (born 1953), who has served as leader for the NRC-Canadian Astronomy Data Centre since 2001, which has contributed numerous innovations to data management for, inter alia, HST, CFHT, Gemini, JCMT and MOST observatories and to the Virtual Observatory. || 
|}

315201–315300 

|-id=218
| 315218 La Boetie ||  || Etienne de La Boetie (1530–1563) was a French writer and a founder of modern political philosophy. || 
|-id=276
| 315276 Yurigradovsky ||  || Yuri Grygorovych Gradovsky (born 1956), a history teacher by education, is a Ukrainian composer, and the founder and leader of the Drevlyany music band of the Zhytomyr Philharmonic. || 
|}

315301–315400 

|-bgcolor=#f2f2f2
| colspan=4 align=center | 
|}

315401–315500 

|-id=493
| 315493 Zimin ||  || Dmitry Borisovich Zimin (born 1933), a Russian scientist and inventor. || 
|}

315501–315600 

|-id=577
| 315577 Carmenchu ||  || Carmen Castillo Bartolomé (born 1959), a Spanish artist. || 
|-id=579
| 315579 Vandersyppe ||  || Anne Vandersyppe (1958–2019) was a member of the Solar Physics and Space Weather department of the Royal Observatory of Belgium. || 
|}

315601–315700 

|-bgcolor=#f2f2f2
| colspan=4 align=center | 
|}

315701–315800 

|-bgcolor=#f2f2f2
| colspan=4 align=center | 
|}

315801–315900 

|-bgcolor=#f2f2f2
| colspan=4 align=center | 
|}

315901–316000 

|-bgcolor=#f2f2f2
| colspan=4 align=center | 
|}

References 

315001-316000